Diğdem Hoşgör (born October 2, 1991) is a Turkish women's handballer, who plays in the Turkish Women's Handball Super League for Muratpaşa Bld. SK, and the Turkey national team. The -tall sportswoman plays in the left back position.

Private life
Diğdem Hoşgör was born to a handballer father in Antalya on October 2, 1991. Her older sister Sinem Hoşgör Eyövge is also a handball player.

Playing career

Club
Diğdem Hoşgör plays left back in her hometown for Muratpaşa Bld. SK, which competes in the Turkish Women's Handball Super League. She enjoyed her team's third place in the 2010–11 season. Her team became consecutive three seasons league champion in 2011–12, 2012–13, 2013–14. In the 2014–15 season, her team lost the champion title in the play-offs. She is the team's topscorer.

Hoşgör took part at the Women's EHF Challenge Cup matches in 2010–11 and 2011–12, which her team finished both as runner-up. She played in the Women's EHF Cup Winners' Cup matches (2012–13 and 2013–14), at the Women's EHF Champions League competitions (2012–13 and 2013–14) as well as at the Women's EHF Cup games (2014–15 and 2015–16).

International

In 2009, she was called up to the Turkey women's national beach handball team.

Diğdem Hoşgör was admitted to the Turkey women's national handball team in January 2010. She is part of the national team since then. She played in the European Women's Handball Championship qualification matches of 2014  and 2016. In 2013, she took part at the Mediterranean Games.

Honours
 Turkish Women's Handball Super League
 Winners (2): 2011–12, 2012–13, 2013–14.
 Runner-up (1): 2014–15.
 Third place (1): 2010–11

References 

1991 births
Sportspeople from Antalya
Turkish beach handball players
Turkish female handball players
Muratpaşa Bld. SK (women's handball) players
Turkey women's national handball players
Living people
Competitors at the 2013 Mediterranean Games
Mediterranean Games competitors for Turkey
21st-century Turkish sportswomen